The Forth & Clyde Hotel is a former pub located in Balmain, a suburb in the inner west region of Sydney, in the state of New South Wales, Australia. The former pub was one of a number of buildings which formed an integral part of the shipbuilding and industrial heritage of the local area.

The pub featured as a film location for the cult motorcycle bikie movie Stone (1974). The building has been occupied by various businesses since it closed in 1972 and has extensive water views onto Mort Bay. Recently, it has been used for private housing.

An early publican of the hotel was Edward McDonald.

Architecture
The pub is a heritage-listed, two storey sandstone corner building and timber verandah with posts to the footpath.

See also

List of pubs in Australia

References

External links

Defunct hotels in Sydney
Hotel buildings completed in 1857
Hotels established in 1857
1857 establishments in Australia
1972 disestablishments in Australia
Balmain, New South Wales
Former pubs in Australia